Shailesh "Joe" Jogia (born 13 November 1975) is an English retired professional snooker player of Indian descent.

Early life

Born in Leicester, England in 1975, Jogia lived for a time in the Hertfordshire town of Letchworth, before returning to live in Leicester.

Career
Jogia reached the last 32 of four ranking events, the first two being the 2004 Grand Prix and British Open, within a few weeks of each other. He won the English Open title in 1998, and has defeated players such as Joe Swail, Mark King and Stuart Bingham in his career. His highest  in a ranking event is 137, in qualifying rounds of the 2009 Grand Prix, although he has also made a 147 maximum in pro-am play.

He dropped off the pro Main Tour after the 2006–07 season. In 2008–09 he topped the pro-am International Open Series to regain a place on the Main Tour, although this was a wildcard place as he was not a member of his national governing body at that time.

He qualified for the last 32 of a ranking event for the first time in 6 years at the 2010 World Open, where he played Liu Song and lost 3–1.

Jogia made it to the main stage of the UK Championship for the first time in 2011 by beating Jamie Cope 6–3 in the final round of qualifying. He was drawn against world number 2, Mark Williams, and won two successive frames to tie the match at 4–4. Unfortunately, Jogia had a bad "" while well placed to win the next frame and would lose the match 6–4. Jogia had a good season in the minor-ranking Players Tour Championship series as he played in all 12 of the events, reaching the semi-finals in the first event, where he lost 2–4 to Ronnie O'Sullivan. He also had two last 16 finishes to be placed 28th on the PTC Order of Merit, just out of the top 24 who qualified for the PTC Finals. Jogia only won one more match in qualifying after his UK Championship exploits and finished the season ranked world number 47.

On 30 May 2012, it was announced by World Snooker that Jogia had been suspended from playing on the tour because of unusual betting patterns on his match against Matthew Selt in the Snooker Shoot-Out, which was due to take place on 28 January 2012. A high number of bets were placed on Jogia to lose the match, which he claimed was because of an injury to his knee and the assumption that he would be unable to play to an adequate standard. Jogia withdrew from the event the day before it started, but faced a formal hearing of the World Snooker Disciplinary Committee in July. At the hearing it was revealed that Jogia had been in repeated communication with two people who placed 19 bets on the match and that 11 of these bets had been placed before he sought medical attention regarding his knee injury. Jogia was banned from snooker until after the 2014 World Championship and fined £2,000 as a contribution to the cost of the investigation.

On 7 January 2013, Jogia was removed from the snooker world rankings following ET 2012/13 – Event 6, after his WPBSA membership was terminated.

References

External links
 
 

English snooker players
1975 births
Living people
Sportspeople from Leicester
English people of Indian descent